This is a list of schools in North Yorkshire, England.

State-funded schools

Primary schools

Admiral Long CE Primary School, Burnt Yates
Ainderby Steeple CE Primary School, Morton-on-Swale
Airy Hill Primary School, Whitby
Aiskew, Leeming Bar CE Primary School, Leeming Bar
Alanbrooke Academy, Topcliffe
All Saints RC Primary School, Thirsk
All Saints CE School, Kirkby Overblow
Alverton Primary School, Northallerton
Amotherby Community Primary School, Amotherby
Applegarth Primary School, Northallerton
Appleton Roebuck Primary School, Appleton Roebuck
Appleton Wiske Community Primary School, Appleton Wiske
Askrigg Primary School, Askrigg
Askwith Community Primary School, Askwith
Aspin Park Academy, Knaresborough
Athelstan Community Primary School, Sherburn-in-Elmet
Austwick CE Primary School, Austwick
Bainbridge CE Primary School, Bainbridge
Barkston Ash RC Primary School, Barkston Ash
Barlby Bridge Community Primary School, Barlby
Barlby Community Primary School, Barlby
Barlow CE Primary School, Barlow
Barrowcliff School, Scarborough
Barton CE Primary School, Barton
Barwic Parade Community Primary School, Selby
Beckwithshaw Community Primary School, Beckwithshaw
Bedale CE Primary School, Bedale
Bentham Community Primary School, Bentham
Bilsdale Midcable Chop Gate CE Primary School, Chop Gate
Bilton Grange Primary School, Harrogate
Birstwith CE Primary School, Birstwith
Bishop Monkton CE Primary School, Bishop Monkton
Bolton-on-Swale St Mary's CE Primary School, Bolton-on-Swale
Boroughbridge Primary School, Boroughbridge
The Boyle and Petyt Primary School, Beamsley
Bradleys Both Community Primary School, Bradley
Braeburn Primary Academy, Eastfield
Brayton CE Primary School, Brayton
Brompton and Sawdon Community Primary School, Brompton-by-Sawdon
Brompton Community Primary School, Brompton
Brompton-on-Swale CE Primary School, Brompton-on-Swale
Broomfield School, Northallerton
Brotherton and Byram Community Primary Academy, Brotherton
Burneston CE Primary School, Burneston
Burnsall Primary School, Burnsall
Burton Leonard CE Primary School, Burton Leonard
Burton Salmon Community Primary School, Burton Salmon
Camblesforth Community Primary Academy, Camblesforth
Cambrai Primary School, Catterick Garrison
Carleton Endowed CE Primary School, Carleton-in-Craven
Carlton and Faceby CE Primary School, Carlton in Cleveland
Carlton Miniott Primary Academy, Carlton Miniott
Carlton Primary School, Carlton
Carnagill Community Primary School, Catterick Garrison
Castleton Primary School, Castleton
Cawood CE Primary School, Cawood
Cayton Community Primary School, Cayton
Chapel Haddlesey CE Primary School, Chapel Haddlesey
Christ Church CE Primary School, Skipton
Cliffe Primary School, Cliffe
Colburn Community Primary School, Colburn
Cononley Community Primary School, Cononley
Coppice Valley Primary School, Harrogate
Cowling Community Primary School, Cowling
Cracoe and Rylstone CE Primary School, Cracoe
Crakehall CE Primary School, Crakehall
Crayke CE Primary School, Crayke
Croft CE Primary School, Croft-on-Tees
Dacre Braithwaite CE Primary School, Braithwaite
Danby CE School, Danby
Darley Community Primary School, Darley
Dishforth Airfield Community Primary School, Dishforth Airfield
Dishforth CE Primary School, Dishforth
Easingwold Community Primary School, Easingwold
East Ayton Community Primary School, East Ayton
East Cowton CE Primary School, East Cowton
East Whitby Primary Academy, Whitby
Egton CE Primary School, Egton
Embsay CE Primary School, Embsay
Escrick CE Primary School, Escrick
Fairburn Community Primary School, Fairburn
Filey CE Infants Academy, Filey
Filey Junior School, Filey
Follifoot CE Primary School, Follifoot
Forest of Galtres Anglican-Methodist Primary School, Shipton
Foston CE Primary School, Foston
Fountains CE Primary School, Grantley
Fountains Earth CE Primary School, Lofthouse
Friarage Community Primary School, Scarborough
Fylingdales CE VC Primary School, Fylingthorpe
Gargrave CE Primary School, Gargrave
Giggleswick Primary School, Giggleswick
Gillamoor CE Primary School, Gillamoor
Gladstone Road Primary School, Scarborough
Glaisdale Primary School, Glaisdale
Glasshouses Community Primary School, Glasshouses
Glusburn Community Primary School, Glusburn
Goathland Primary School, Goathland
Goldsborough CE Primary School, Goldsborough
Grassington CE Primary School, Grassington
Great Ouseburn Community Primary School, Great Ouseburn
Great Smeaton School, Great Smeaton
Greatwood Community Primary School, Skipton
Green Hammerton CE Primary School, Green Hammerton
Grewelthorpe CE Primary School, Grewelthorpe
Grove Road Community Primary School, Harrogate
Gunnerside Methodist Primary School, Gunnerside
Hackforth and Hornby CE Primary School, Hackforth
Hackness CE Primary School, Hackness
Hambleton CE Primary School, Hambleton
Hampsthwaite CE Primary School, Hampsthwaite
Hawes Primary School, Hawes
Hawsker Cum Stainsacre CE Primary School, Hawsker
Hellifield Community Primary School, Hellifield
Helmsley Community Primary School, Helmsley
Hemingbrough Community Primary School, Hemingbrough
Hensall Community Primary School, Hensall
Hertford Vale CE Primary School, Staxton
Hipswell CE Primary School, Hipswell
Holy Trinity CE Infant School, Ripon
Holy Trinity CE Junior School, Ripon
Hookstone Chase Primary School, Harrogate
Hovingham CE Primary School, Hovingham
Huby CE Primary School, Huby
Hunmanby Primary School, Hunmanby
Hunton and Arrathorne Community Primary School, Hunton
Husthwaite CE Primary School, Husthwaite
Hutton Rudby Primary School, Hutton Rudby
Ingleby Greenhow CE Primary School, Ingleby Greenhow
Ingleton Primary School, Ingleton
Keeble Gateway Academy, Sowerby
Kellington Primary School, Kellington
Kettlesing Felliscliffe Community Primary School, Kettlesing
Kettlewell Primary School, Kettlewell
Kildwick CE Primary School, Kildwick
Killinghall CE Primary School, Killinghall
Kirby Hill CE Primary School, Kirby Hill
Kirk Fenton CE Primary School, Church Fenton
Kirk Hammerton CE Primary School, Kirk Hammerton
Kirk Smeaton CE Primary School, Kirk Smeaton
Kirkby and Great Broughton CE Primary School, Kirkby
Kirkby Fleetham CE Primary School, Kirkby Fleetham
Kirkby in Malhamdale United Primary School, Kirkby Malham
Kirkby Malzeard CE Primary School, Kirkby Malzeard
Kirkbymoorside Community Primary School, Kirkbymoorside
Knaresborough St John's CE Primary School, Knaresborough
Knayton CE Academy, Knayton
Langton Primary School, Langton
Le Cateau Community Primary School, Catterick Garrison
Lealholm Primary School, Lealholm
Leavening Community Primary School, Leavening
Leeming and Londonderry Community Primary School, Leeming
Leeming RAF Community Primary School, Gatenby
Leyburn Primary School, Leyburn
Lindhead School, Burniston
Linton-on-Ouse Primary School, Linton-on-Ouse
Long Marston CE Primary School, Long Marston
Long Preston Endowed Primary School, Long Preston
Longman's Hill Community Primary School, Brayton
Lothersdale Primary School, Lothersdale
Luttons Community Primary School, West Lutton
Lythe CE Primary School, Lythe
Malton Primary Academy, Malton
Markington CE Primary School, Markington
Marton-cum-Grafton CE Primary School, Marton
Marwood CE Infant School, Great Ayton
Masham CE Primary School, Masham
Meadowside Academy, Knaresborough
Melsonby Methodist Primary School, Melsonby
Michael Syddall CE Aided Primary School, Catterick
Middleham CE School, Middleham
Mill Hill Primary School, Northallerton
Monk Fryston CE Primary School, Monk Fryston
Moorside Primary School, Ripon
Nawton Community Primary School, Nawton
New Park Primary Academy, Harrogate
Newby and Scalby Primary School, Newby
North and South Cowton Community Primary School, North Cowton
North Duffield Community Primary School, North Duffield
North Rigton CE Primary School, North Rigton
North Stainley CE Primary School, North Stainley
Northstead Community Primary School, Scarborough
Norton Community Primary School, Norton-on-Derwent
Nun Monkton Primary Foundation School, Nun Monkton
Oakridge Community Primary School, Hinderwell
Oatlands Community Junior School, Harrogate
Oatlands Infant School, Harrogate
Osmotherley Primary School, Osmotherley
Outwood Primary Academy Alne, Alne
Outwood Primary Academy Greystone, Ripon
Overdale Community Primary School, Eastfield
Pannal Primary School, Pannal
Pickering Community Infant School, Pickering
Pickering Community Junior School, Pickering
Pickhill CE Primary School, Pickhill
Ravensworth CE Primary School, Ravensworth
Reeth Community Primary School, Reeth
Riccall Community Primary School, Riccall
Richard Taylor CE Primary School, Harrogate
Richmond Methodist Primary School, Richmond
Rillington Primary School, Rillington
Ripley Endowed CE School, Ripley
Ripon Cathedral CE Primary School, Ripon
Riverside School, Tadcaster
Roecliffe CE Primary School, Roecliffe
Romanby Primary School, Romanby
Roseberry Academy, Great Ayton
Rosedale Abbey Community Primary School, Rosedale Abbey
Rossett Acre Primary School, Harrogate
Ruswarp CE Primary School, Ruswarp
Sacred Heart RC Primary School, Northallerton
St Benedict's RC Primary School, Ampleforth
St Cuthbert's CE Primary School, Pateley Bridge
St George's RC Primary School, Eastfield
St Hedda's RC Primary School, Egton Bridge
St Hilda's Ampleforth CE Primary School, Ampleforth
St Joseph's RC Primary School, Harrogate
St Joseph's RC Primary School, Pickering
St Martin's CE Primary School, Scarborough
St Mary's RC Primary School, Knaresborough
St Mary's RC Primary School, Malton
St Mary's RC Primary School, Richmond
St Mary's RC Primary School, Selby
St Nicholas CE Primary School, West Tanfield
St Peter's Brafferton CE Primary School, Brafferton
St Peter's CE Primary School, Harrogate
St Peter's RC Primary School, Scarborough
St Robert's RC Primary School, Harrogate
St Stephen's RC Primary School, Skipton
St Wilfrid's RC Primary School, Ripon
Saltergate Community Junior School, Harrogate
Saltergate Infant School, Harrogate
Sand Hutton CE Primary School, Sand Hutton
Saxton CE Primary School, Saxton
Scotton Lingerfield Community Primary School, Scotton
Seamer and Irton Community Primary School, Seamer
Selby Abbey CE Primary School, Selby
Selby Community Primary School, Selby
Seton Community Primary School, Staithes
Sessay CE VC Primary School, Sessay
Settle CE Primary School, Settle
Settrington All Saints' CE Primary School, Settrington
Sharow CE Primary School, Sharow
Sherburn CE Primary School, Sherburn
Sherburn Hungate Primary School, Sherburn-in-Elmet
Sheriff Hutton Primary School, Sheriff Hutton
Sicklinghall Community Primary School, Sicklinghall
Sinnington Community Primary School, Sinnington
Skelton Newby Hall CE Primary School, Skelton-on-Ure
Skipton Parish Church CE Primary School, Skipton
Sleights CE Primary School, Sleights
Slingsby Community Primary School, Slingsby
Snainton CE Primary School, Snainton
Snape Community Primary School, Snape
South Kilvington CE Primary Academy, South Kilvington
South Milford Primary School, South Milford
South Otterington CE Primary School, South Otterington
Sowerby Primary Academy, Sowerby
Spennithorne CE Primary School, Spennithorne
Spofforth CE Primary School, Spofforth
Stakesby Primary Academy, Whitby
Starbeck Primary Academy, Harrogate
Staveley Community Primary School, Staveley
Staynor Hall Primary Academy, Selby
Stillington Primary School, Stillington
Stokesley Primary Academy, Stokesley
Summerbridge Community Primary School, Summerbridge
Sutton-in-Craven CE Primary School, Sutton-in-Craven
Sutton-in-Craven Community Primary School, Sutton-in-Craven
Sutton on the Forest CE Primary School, Sutton-on-the-Forest
Tadcaster Primary Academy, Tadcaster
Terrington CE Primary School, Terrington
The Boyle and Petyt Primary School
Thirsk Community Primary School, Thirsk
Thomas Hinderwell Primary Academy, Scarborough
Thornton Dale CE Primary School, Thornton-le-Dale
Thornton in Craven Community Primary School, Thornton in Craven
Thornton Watlass CE Primary School, Thornton Watlass
Thorpe Willoughby Community Primary School, Thorpe Willoughby
Threshfield School, Threshfield
Tockwith CE Primary Academy, Tockwith
Topcliffe CE Academy, Topcliffe
Trinity Academy Eppleby Forcett, Eppleby
Trinity Academy Middleton Tyas, Middleton Tyas
Trinity Academy Richmond, Richmond
Warthill CE Primary School, Warthill
Water Street Community Primary School, Skipton
Wavell Community Infant School, Catterick Garrison
Wavell Community Junior School, Catterick Garrison
Welburn Community Primary School, Welburn
West Burton CE Primary School, West Burton
West Cliff Primary School, Whitby
West Heslerton CE Primary School, West Heslerton
Western Primary School, Harrogate
Wheatcroft Community Primary School, Scarborough
Whitley and Eggborough Community Primary School, Whitley
Willow Tree Community Primary School, Harrogate
Wistow Parochial CE Primary School, Wistow
Wykeham CE Primary School, Wykeham

Non-selective secondary schools

Barlby High School, Barlby
Bedale High School, Bedale
Boroughbridge High School, Boroughbridge
Brayton Academy, Brayton
Caedmon College, Whitby
Eskdale School, Whitby
Filey School, Filey
George Pindar School, Eastfield
Graham School, Scarborough
Harrogate Grammar School, Harrogate
Harrogate High School, Harrogate
Holy Family Catholic High School, Carlton
King James's School, Knaresborough
Lady Lumley's School, Pickering
Malton School, Malton
Nidderdale High School, Pateley Bridge
Northallerton School, Northallerton
Norton College, Norton-on-Derwent
Outwood Academy Easingwold, Easingwold
Outwood Academy Ripon, Ripon
Richmond School, Richmond
Risedale School, Catterick Garrison
Rossett School, Harrogate
Ryedale School, Nawton
St Aidan's Church of England High School, Harrogate
St Augustine's Catholic School, Scarborough
St Francis Xavier School, Richmond
St. John Fisher Catholic High School, Harrogate
Scalby School, Newby
Scarborough University Technical College, Scarborough
Selby High School, Selby
Settle College, Settle
Sherburn High School, Sherburn-in-Elmet
The Skipton Academy, Skipton
South Craven School, Cross Hills
Stokesley School, Stokesley
Tadcaster Grammar School, Tadcaster
Thirsk School and Sixth Form College,  Sowerby
Upper Wharfedale School, Threshfield
The Wensleydale School, Leyburn

Grammar schools
Ermysted's Grammar School, Skipton
Ripon Grammar School, Ripon
Skipton Girls' High School, Skipton

Special and alternative schools

Brompton Hall School, Brompton-by-Sawdon
Brooklands School, Skipton
Craven Pupil Referral Service, Skipton
The Dales School, Morton-on-Swale
Forest Moor School, Darley
Mowbray School, Bedale
The Rubicon Centre, Selby
Scarborough Pupil Referral Unit, Scarborough
Springhead School, Scarborough
Springwater School, Harrogate
Springwell Harrogate, Harrogate
The Sunbeck Centre, Northallerton
Welburn Hall School, Kirkbymoorside
The Woodlands Academy, Scarborough

Further education
Craven College
Scarborough Sixth Form College
Scarborough TEC
Selby College

Independent schools

Primary and preparatory schools
Aysgarth School, Newton-le-Willows
Belmont Grosvenor School, Birstwith
Brackenfield School, Harrogate
Moorlands Waldorf School, Botton
Terrington Hall School, Terrington
Wharfedale Montessori School, Skipton

Senior and all-through schools

Ampleforth College, Ampleforth
Ashville College, Harrogate
Cundall Manor School, Cundall
Fyling Hall School, Robin Hood's Bay
Giggleswick School, Giggleswick
Harrogate Ladies' College, Harrogate
Queen Ethelburga's Collegiate, Thorpe Underwood
Queen Margaret's School, Escrick
Queen Mary's School, Topcliffe
Read School, Drax
Scarborough College, Scarborough

Special and alternative schools

Breckenbrough School, Sandhutton
Cambian Scarborough School, Eastfield
Cambian Spring Hill School, Ripon
Cedar House School, Low Bentham
Clervaux Garden School, Croft-on-Tees
Fenton Grange School, Church Fenton
Robert Holme Academy, Brigg
Stonegate School, Low Bentham
Strive for Education, Harrogate

References

North Yorkshire
Schools in North Yorkshire
Schools